Pertti Ilmari Nieminen (9 December 1936 – 8 November 2016) was a Finnish professional ice hockey player who played in the SM-liiga. Born in Hämeenlinna, Finland, he played for HPK and TPS.  He was inducted into the Finnish Hockey Hall of Fame in 1985.

References

External links
 Finnish Hockey Hall of Fame bio

1936 births
2016 deaths
Finnish ice hockey players
People from Hämeenlinna
HC TPS players
Olympic ice hockey players of Finland
Ice hockey players at the 1960 Winter Olympics
Sportspeople from Kanta-Häme